Vascellum is a genus of puffball fungi in the family Agaricaceae. The genus was defined by Czech mycologist František Šmarda in 1958.

Species
Vascellum abscissum (R.E.Fr.) Kreisel 1962 – South America
Vascellum angulatum (Dissing & M.Lange) P.Ponce de León 1970
Vascellum cingulatum Homrich 1988 – South America
Vascellum cruciatum (Rostk.) P.Ponce de León 1970 – Europe, North America, South America
Vascellum cuzcoense Homrich 1988 – South America
Vascellum delicatum Homrich 1988 – South America
Vascellum djurense (Henn.) P.Ponce de León 1970 – Africa
Vascellum endotephrum (Pat.) Demoulin & Dring 1975 – Africa
Vascellum floridanum A.H.Sm. 1974 – United States
Vascellum hyalinum Homrich 1988 – South America
Vascellum intermedium A.H.Sm. 1974 – United States
Vascellum lloydianum A.H.Sm. 1974 – United States
Vascellum pampeanum (Speg.) Homrich 1988 – South America
Vascellum qudenii (Bottomley) P.Ponce de León 1970
Vascellum rhodesianum (Verwoerd) P.Ponce de León 1970
Vascellum texense A.H.Sm. 1974 – United States
Vascellum vanderystii (Bres.) P.Ponce de León 1970

See also
List of Agaricales genera
List of Agaricaceae genera

References

External links

Agaricaceae
Agaricales genera